Kytococcus sedentarius is a marine dwelling Gram positive bacterium in the genus Kytococcus. It is known for the production of polyketide antibiotics as well as for its role as an opportunistic pathogen. It is strictly aerobic and can only grow when amino acids are provided.

It is found in tetrads, irregular clusters, and cubical packets of eight. It is catalase positive, oxidase positive, and exhibits strictly aerobic metabolism. Optimum growth temperature is 25-37 C. It is primarily isolated from human skin, and is one of the major causes of pitted keratolysis. Once considered a species of the genus Micrococcus.

Genome
The genome has been sequenced and contains 2,785,024 bp, which is among the smallest for Actinomycetes, with a G+C content of 71.6%. This encodes 2639 protein coding genes.

References

Further reading

External links
Type strain of Kytococcus sedentarius at BacDive -  the Bacterial Diversity Metadatabase

Micrococcales
Bacteria described in 1944